Robert Schneider (16 June 1961) is an Austrian writer, who published novels including Schlafes Bruder, texts for the theatre, and poetry. His works have been translated to many languages. Schlafes Bruder became the basis of a film, a ballet, an opera and several plays, and received international awards. Schneider withdrew from writing in 2007.

Career 
Born in Bregenz, Vorarlberg, Austria, Schneider was adopted at age two by a couple of peasants and grew up in the village of Meschach near Götzis, where he still lives as a freelance writer. He studied composition, theatre sciences and art history in Vienna from 1981 to 1986. He discontinued his studies to become a writer, making a living by working as a tourist guide and organist. He received several scholarships for literature.

His first novel, Schlafes Bruder (Brother of Sleep), was rejected by 24 publishers, and finally appeared in 1992 by Reclam in Leipzig. The book, telling the fictional story of the musician Johannes Elias Alder, became an international success, was translated into many languages, and was made part of school canons. A film version was made in 1995, directed by Joseph Vilsmaier, which became the basis for a ballet at the Pfalztheater in Kaiserslautern, an opera by Herbert Willi, and several plays.

Schneider's second novel, appeared in 1998, dealing with the rise and fall of the fictional town of Jakobsroth in the Rhine valley. The work received scathing reviews. Schneider conceived the novels as part of a trilogy, Rheintalische Trilogie (Trilogy of the Rhine Valley). He completed the trilogy with Die Unberührten, published in 2000. Based on historic events, it tells the story of two peasant children who are sent to the United States during the Great Depression. Schneider lived in the US for a while to research there. His novel  tells the story of Jan Beukels (John of Leiden), an anabaptist who led the Münster rebellion. Schneider's 2007 novel  (The Revelation) deals with the find of a score by Bach, which ruins the life of the lucky musicologist from Naumburg.

Schneider named traditional Austrian storytelling until 1945 as the basis for his work. He refuses to comment on his books, saying: "Alles, was ein Schriftsteller über seine Bücher sagt, kann nur verstören. Sie müssen ihren Weg ohne ihn gehen" (Everything an author can say about his books can only unsettle. They have to go their way without him). In an interview in 2014, he said that books are media of the 19th century which do not function anymore.

Awards 
Schneider has received several scholarships and awards, including:
 1990: , for Traum und Trauer des jungen H.
 1993: Prize of the Potsdamer Theatertage, for Dreck – Über die Angst vor dem Fremden
 1993: Alemannischer Literaturpreis
 1993: Robert Musil scholarship of Vienna
 1994: Literature prize of the Salzburg Easter Festival
 1994: Prix Médicis Étranger
 1994: Premio Grinzane Cavour
 1994: Civis Media Prize, audio play prize of the WDR
 1995: Marieluise-Fleißer-Preis
 1995: Premio Itas del Libro di Montagna (Trento)
 2008: Phantastik-Preis der Stadt Wetzlar, for Die Offenbarung

Work

Novels 

 Schlafes Bruder. Reclam, Leipzig 1992, .
 . , Munich 1998, .
 . Albrecht Knaus Verlag, München 2000, .
 . Novella. Reclam, Leipzig 2001, .
 Schatten. Reclam, Leipzig 2002, .
 . Aufbau-Verlag, Berlin 2004, .
 . Aufbau-Verlag, Berlin 2007, .

Drama 
 Der falsche Prinz, comedy after the fairy-tale by Wilhelm Hauff, 1983
 Hitler mein. Eine Liebesrede, premiere: 1989, Götzis, Alte Krone
 Dreck. Monolog über die Angst vor dem Fremden, premiere: 1993, Thalia Theater (Hamburg)
 Traum und Trauer des jungen H., premiere: 1993, Schauspiel Hannover
 Alte Tage, comedy, premiere: 1994, Götzis, Am Bach
 Komödie vom deutschen Heimweh, premiere: 1999, Schauspielhaus Zürich

Poetry 
 Gegengebet. 1992, Weitra 1995.
 acht preisungen. 2005, Halle (Saale) 2006.

References

External links 

 
 Robert Schneider goodreads.com
 
  Brother of Sleep / Robert Schneider, Author Overlook Press publishersweekly.com

Austrian male writers
20th-century Austrian novelists
21st-century Austrian novelists
1961 births
Living people
People from Bregenz